Hassan Dandach is a Professional Lebanese basketball player. He currently plays the point guard position at Atlas Ferzol First Division. Hassan was selected by Lebanese scouts to be in the national team reserve roster after his performance in the 2013–14 season.

Career
Al Hassan was born on May 11, 1991 in Beirut, Lebanon. Before starting his professional career Hassan had been training in the United States at various camps and showed an interest to enter in the 2013 NBA Draft, but went in undrafted. Hassan moved back to Lebanon sign for Al Mouttahed Tripoli for one season before moving to Tadamon Zouk in the 2013–14 season.

References

External links 
http://basketball.realgm.com/player/Hassan-Dandach/Summary/53541

1991 births
Living people
Lebanese men's basketball players
Point guards